The Cream of Steve Harley & Cockney Rebel is a compilation album by Steve Harley & Cockney Rebel, released by EMI Gold in 1999. It features material from Cockney Rebel, Steve Harley & Cockney Rebel and Harley's solo career. It contains sixteen tracks, covering Harley and the band's career from Cockney Rebel's 1973 album The Human Menagerie to Harley's 1979 album The Candidate, as well as the 1982 non-album single "I Can't Even Touch You".

Background
The compilation, originally released in 1999, followed from another Steve Harley EMI compilation More Than Somewhat – The Very Best of Steve Harley, which had been released in 1998. The Cream of Steve Harley & Cockney Rebels artwork and design was handled by P. Linard Marketing & Advertising Ltd. The compilation later made an appearance in the official UK Budget Albums Chart during January 2006. It reached #21 on 14 January 2006, and lasted within the Top 50 for four weeks.

The album was released by EMI Gold on CD in the UK only. Later on 28 February 2003, the album was made available as an online digital MP3 download. On 7 July 2008, the album was re-issued by EMI Gold for release in the UK and Europe as The Best of Steve Harley and Cockney Rebel. This release had the same track-listing, but new artwork, featuring a photograph of Harley in front of a red background.

Track listing

Critical reception

Dave Thompson of AllMusic reviewed the compilation, writing: "This compilation brings together an unchallenging but almost uniformly excellent roundup of Steve Harley's 1970s output. It brushes all of the expected high points. The real meat, however, lies among the excerpted album cuts, as the compilers treat all seven original Harley/Cockney Rebel LPs with more or less equal respect – many fans would have drawn a line after the first three. But "White White Dove," "Roll the Dice," and the like all deserve a fresh hearing, and The Cream of emerges with almost unruffled consistency, and an overall impact that is all the more satisfying for being so unexpected."

Chart performance

References

1999 compilation albums
EMI Records compilation albums